Frank Holmes may refer to:

Sir Frank Holmes (economist) (1924–2011), New Zealand economist
Frank Holmes (geologist) (1874–1947), British geologist
Frank E. Holmes, chief executive and chief investment officer at U.S. Global Investors
Frank Holmes (athlete) (1885–1980), American track and field athlete
Frank J. Holmes, American painter
Frank Holmes (filmmaker) (1908–1990), producer and director of Seaport of the Prairies
Frank Holmes (footballer) (1900–1989), Australian rules footballer
Frankie Holmes, a co-host and subject of the documentary television series Dopesick Nation